Kitty Love: An Homage to Cats is a 2020 Dutch documentary film directed by Mark Verkerk and written by Dennis Gerritsen and Trui van de Brug.

Cast 
 Abatutu - The Cat
 Nicolette Kluijver - (voice)
 Djae Van der Helm
 Sabine Van der Helm
 Milouska Meulens

References

External links
 
 

2021 films
Dutch documentary films
2020s Dutch-language films